Lymphedema, also known as lymphoedema and lymphatic edema, is a condition of localized swelling caused by a compromised lymphatic system. The lymphatic system functions as a critical portion of the body's immune system and returns interstitial fluid to the bloodstream. Lymphedema is most frequently a complication of cancer treatment or parasitic infections, but it can also be seen in a number of genetic disorders. Though incurable and progressive, a number of treatments may improve symptoms. Tissues with lymphedema are at high risk of infection because the lymphatic system has been compromised.

While there is no cure, treatment may improve outcomes. This commonly include compression therapy, good skin care, exercise, and manual lymphatic drainage (MLD), which together are known as combined decongestive therapy. Diuretics are not useful.

Signs and symptoms

The most common manifestation of lymphedema is soft tissue swelling, edema. As the disorder progresses, worsening edema and skin changes including discoloration, verrucous (wart-like) hyperplasia, hyperkeratosis, papillomatosis, dermal thickening, and ulcers may be seen. Additionally, there is increased risk of infection of the skin, known as Erysipelas.

Complications
When lymphatic impairment becomes so great that the lymph fluid exceeds the lymphatic system's ability to transport it, an abnormal amount of protein-rich fluid collects in the tissues. Left untreated, this stagnant, protein-rich fluid causes tissue channels to increase in size and number, reducing oxygen availability. This interferes with wound healing and provides a rich culture medium for bacterial growth that can result in infections, cellulitis, lymphangitis, lymphadenitis, and, in severe cases, skin ulcers. It is vital for lymphedema patients to be aware of the symptoms of infection and to seek immediate treatment, since recurrent infections or cellulitis, in addition to their inherent danger, further damage the lymphatic system and set up a vicious circle.

In rare cases, lymphedema may lead to a form of cancer called lymphangiosarcoma, although the mechanism of carcinogenesis is not understood. Lymphedema-associated lymphangiosarcoma is called Stewart–Treves syndrome. Lymphangiosarcoma most frequently occurs in cases of long-standing lymphedema. The incidence of angiosarcoma is estimated to be 0.45% in patients living five years after radical mastectomy. Lymphedema is also associated with a low grade form of cancer called retiform hemangioendothelioma (a low grade angiosarcoma).

Lymphedema can be disfiguring, and may result in a poor body image, which can cause psychological distress. Complications of lymphedema can cause difficulties in activities of daily living.

Causes
Lymphedema may be inherited (primary) or caused by injury to the lymphatic vessels (secondary).

Lymph node damage
It is most frequently seen after lymph node dissection, surgery and/or radiation therapy, in which damage to the lymphatic system is caused during the treatment of cancer, most notably breast cancer. In many patients with cancer, this condition does not develop until months or even years after therapy has concluded. Lymphedema may also be associated with accidents or certain diseases or problems that may inhibit the lymphatic system from functioning properly. In tropical endemic areas of the world, a common cause of secondary lymphedema is filariasis, a parasitic infection. It can also be caused by damage to the lymphatic system from infections such as cellulitis.

Primary lymphedema may be congenital or arise sporadically. Multiple syndromes are associated with primary lymphedema, including Turner syndrome, Milroy's disease, and Klippel–Trénaunay syndrome. It is generally thought to occur as a result of absent or malformed lymph nodes and/or lymphatic channels. Lymphedema may be present at birth, develop at the onset of puberty (praecox), or not become apparent for many years into adulthood (tarda). In men, lower-limb primary lymphedema is most common, occurring in one or both legs. Some cases of lymphedema may be associated with other vascular abnormalities.

Secondary lymphedema affects both men and women. In women, it is most prevalent in the upper limbs after breast cancer surgery, in particular after axillary lymph node dissection, occurring in the arm on the side of the body in which the surgery is performed. Breast and trunk lymphedema can also occur but go unrecognised as there is swelling in the area after surgery, and its symptoms (peau d'orange and/or an inverted nipple) can be confused with post surgery fat necrosis. In Western countries, secondary lymphedema is most commonly due to cancer treatment. Between 38 and 89% of breast cancer patients have lymphedema due to axillary lymph node dissection and/or radiation. Unilateral lymphedema occurs in up to 41% of patients after gynecologic cancer. For men, a 5-66% incidence of lymphedema has been reported in patients treated with incidence depending on whether staging or radical removal of lymph glands was done in addition to radiotherapy.

Head and neck lymphedema can be caused by surgery or radiation therapy for tongue or throat cancer. It may also occur in the lower limbs or groin after surgery for colon, ovarian or uterine cancer, in which removal of lymph nodes or radiation therapy is required. Surgery or treatment for prostate, colon and testicular cancers may result in secondary lymphedema, particularly when lymph nodes have been removed or damaged.

The onset of secondary lymphedema in patients who have had cancer surgery has also been linked to aircraft flight (likely due to decreased cabin pressure or relative immobility). For cancer survivors, therefore, wearing a prescribed and properly fitted compression garment may help decrease swelling during air travel.

Some cases of lower-limb lymphedema have been associated with the use of tamoxifen, due to the blood clots and deep vein thrombosis (DVT) that can be associated with this medication. Resolution of the blood clots or DVT is needed before lymphedema treatment can be initiated.

Infectious causes include lymphatic filariasis.

At birth
Hereditary lymphedema is a primary lymphedema – swelling that results from abnormalities in the lymphatic system that are present from birth. Swelling may be present in a single affected limb, several limbs, genitalia, or the face. It is sometimes diagnosed prenatally by a nuchal scan or post-natally by lymphoscintigraphy. The most common form is Meige disease that usually presents at puberty. Another form of hereditary lymphedema is Milroy's disease caused by mutations in the VEGFR3 gene. Hereditary lymphedema is frequently syndromic and is associated with Turner syndrome, lymphedema–distichiasis syndrome, yellow nail syndrome, and Klippel–Trénaunay syndrome.

One defined genetic cause for hereditary lymphedema is GATA2 deficiency. This deficiency is a grouping of several disorders caused by common defect, viz., familial or sporadic inactivating mutations in one of the two parental GATA2 genes. These autosomal dominant mutations cause a reduction, i.e. a haploinsufficiency, in the cellular levels of the gene's product, GATA2. The GATA2 protein is a transcription factor critical for the embryonic development, maintenance, and functionality of blood-forming, lympathic-forming, and other tissue-forming stem cells. In consequence of these mutations, cellular levels of GATA2 are deficient and individuals develop over time hematological, immunological, lymphatic, and/or other disorders. GATA2 deficiency-induced defects in the lymphatic vessels and valves underlies the development of lymphedema which is primarily located in the lower extremities but may also occur in other places such as the face or testes (i.e. hydrocele). This form of the deficiency, when coupled with sensorineural hearing loss which may also be due to faulty development of the lymphatic system, is sometimes termed the Emberger syndrome.

Primary lymphedema has a quoted incidence of approximately 1-3 births out of every 10,000 births, with a particular female preponderance to male ratio of 3.5:1 In North America, the incidence of primary lymphedema is approximately 1.15 births out of every 100,000 births Compared to secondary lymphedema, primary lymphedema is relatively rare.

Inflammatory lymphedema 

Bilateral lower extremity inflammatory lymphedema (BLEIL) is a distinct type of lymphedema occurring in a setting of acute and prolonged standing, such as in new recruits during basic training. The possible underlying mechanisms are thought to be venous congestion and inflammatory vasculitis.

Physiology
Lymph is formed from the fluid that filters out of the blood circulation and contains proteins, cellular debris, bacteria, etc. The collection of this fluid is carried out by the initial lymph collectors that are blind-ended endothelial-lined vessels with fenestrated openings that allow fluids and particles as large as cells to enter. Once inside the lumen of the lymphatic vessels, the fluid is guided along increasingly larger vessels, first with rudimentary valves to prevent backflow, which later develops into complete valves similar to the venous valve. Once the lymph enters the fully valved lymphatic vessels, it is pumped by a rhythmic peristaltic-like action by smooth muscle cells within the lymphatic vessel walls. This peristaltic action is the primary driving force, moving lymph within its vessel walls. The regulation of the frequency and power of contraction is regulated by the sympathetic nervous system. Lymph movement can be influenced by the pressure of nearby muscle contraction, arterial pulse pressure and the vacuum created in the chest cavity during respiration, but these passive forces contribute only a minor percentage of lymph transport. The fluids collected are pumped into continually larger vessels and through lymph nodes, which remove debris and police the fluid for dangerous microbes. The lymph ends its journey in the thoracic duct or right lymphatic duct, which drain into the blood circulation.

Diagnosis
Diagnosis is generally based on signs and symptoms, with testing used to rule out other potential causes. An accurate diagnosis and staging may help with management. A swollen limb can result from different conditions that require different treatments. Diagnosis of lymphedema is currently based on history, physical exam, and limb measurements. Imaging studies such as lymphoscintigraphy and indocyanine green lymphography are only required when surgery is being considered. However, the ideal method for lymphedema staging to guide the most appropriate treatment is controversial because of several different proposed protocols. Lymphedema can occur in both the upper and lower extremities, and in some cases, the head and neck. Assessment of the extremities first begins with a visual inspection. Color, presence of hair, visible veins, size and any sores or ulcerations are noted. Lack of hair may indicate an arterial circulation problem. Given swelling, the extremities' circumference is measured for reference as time continues. In early stages of lymphedema, elevating the limb may reduce or eliminate the swelling. Palpation of the wrist or ankle can determine the degree of swelling; assessment includes a check of the pulses. The axillary or inguinal nodes may be enlarged due to the swelling. Enlargement of the nodes lasting more than three weeks may indicate infection or other illnesses such as sequela from breast cancer surgery requiring further medical attention.

Diagnosis or early detection of lymphedema is difficult. The first signs may be subjective observations such as a feeling of heaviness in the affected extremity. These may be symptomatic of early-stage lymphedema where accumulation of lymph is mild and not detectable by changes in volume or circumference. As lymphedema progresses, definitive diagnosis is commonly based upon an objective measurement of differences between the affected or at-risk limb at the opposite unaffected limb, e.g. in volume or circumference. No generally accepted criterion is definitively diagnostic, although a volume difference of 200 ml between limbs or a 4-cm difference (at a single measurement site or set intervals along the limb) is often used. Bioimpedance measurement (which measures the amount of fluid in a limb) offers greater sensitivity than existing methods.

Chronic venous stasis changes can mimic early lymphedema, but the changes in venous stasis are more often bilateral and symmetric. Lipedema can also mimic lymphedema, however lipedema characteristically spares the feet beginning abruptly at the medial malleoli (ankle level). As a part of the initial work-up before diagnosing lymphedema, it may be necessary to exclude other potential causes of lower extremity swelling such as kidney failure, hypoalbuminemia, congestive heart-failure, protein-losing nephropathy, pulmonary hypertension, obesity, pregnancy and drug-induced edema.

Classification

According to the Fifth WHO Expert Committee on Filariasis the most common method of classification of lymphedema is as follows: (The same classification method can be used for both primary and secondary lymphedema)
The International Society of Lymphology (ISL) Staging System is based solely on subjective symptoms, making it prone to substantial observer bias. Imaging modalities have been suggested as useful adjuncts to the ISL staging to clarify the diagnosis. The lymphedema expert Dr. Ming-Huei Cheng developed a Cheng's Lymphedema Grading tool to assess the severity of extremity lymphedema based on objective limb measurements and providing appropriate options for management.

I. Grading 

 Grade 1: Spontaneously reversible on elevation. Mostly pitting edema.
 Grade 2: Non-spontaneously reversible on elevation. Mostly non-pitting edema.
 Grade 3: Gross increase in volume and circumference of Grade 2 lymphedema, with eight stages of severity given below based on clinical assessments.

II. Staging 
As described by the Fifth WHO Expert Committee on Filariasis, and endorsed by the American Society of Lymphology., the staging system helps to identify the severity of lymphedema. With the assistance of medical imaging apparatus, such as MRI or CT, staging can be established by the physician, and therapeutic or medical interventions may be applied:
 Stage 0: The lymphatic vessels have sustained some damage that is not yet apparent. Transport capacity is sufficient for the amount of lymph being removed. Lymphedema is not present.
 Stage 1 : Swelling increases during the day and disappears overnight as the patient lies flat in bed. Tissue is still at the pitting stage: when pressed by the fingertips, the affected area indents and reverses with elevation. Usually, upon waking in the morning, the limb or affected area is normal or almost normal in size. Treatment is not necessarily required at this point.
 Stage 2: Swelling is not reversible overnight, and does not disappear without proper management. The tissue now has a spongy consistency and is considered non-pitting: when pressed by the fingertips, the affected area bounces back without indentation. Fibrosis found in Stage 2 lymphedema marks the beginning of the hardening of the limbs and increasing size.
 Stage 3: Swelling is irreversible and usually the limb(s) or affected area becomes increasingly large. The tissue is hard (fibrotic) and unresponsive; some patients consider undergoing reconstructive surgery, called "debulking". This remains controversial, however, since the risks may outweigh the benefits and the further damage done to the lymphatic system may in fact make the lymphedema worse.
 Stage 4: The size and circumference of the affected limb(s) become noticeably large. Bumps, lumps, or protrusions (also called knobs) on the skin begin to appear.
 Stage 5: The affected limb(s) become grossly large; one or more deep skin folds is prevalent among patients in this stage.
 Stage 6: Knobs of small elongated or small rounded sizes cluster together, giving mossy-like shapes on the limb. Mobility of the patient becomes increasingly difficult.
 Stage 7: The person becomes "handicapped", and is unable to independently perform daily routine activities such as walking, bathing and cooking. Assistance from the family and health care system is needed.

Grades
Lymphedema can also be categorized by its severity (usually referenced to a healthy extremity):
 Grade 1 (mild edema): Involves the distal parts such as a forearm and hand or a lower leg and foot. The difference in circumference is less than 4 cm and other tissue changes are not yet present.
 Grade 2 (moderate edema): Involves an entire limb or corresponding quadrant of the trunk. Difference in circumference is 4–6 cm. Tissue changes, such as pitting, are apparent. The patient may experience erysipelas.
 Grade 3a (severe edema): Lymphedema is present in one limb and its associated trunk quadrant. Circumferential difference is greater than 6 centimeters. Significant skin alterations, such as cornification or keratosis, cysts and/or fistulae, are present. Additionally, the patient may experience repeated attacks of erysipelas.
 Grade 3b (massive edema): The same symptoms as grade 3a, except that two or more extremities are affected.
 Grade 4 (gigantic edema): In this stage of lymphedema, the affected extremities are huge, due to almost complete blockage of the lymph channels.

Differential
Lymphedema should not be confused with edema arising from venous insufficiency, which is caused by compromise of the venous drainage rather than lymphatic drainage. However, untreated venous insufficiency can progress into a combined venous/lymphatic disorder.

Treatment
While there is no cure, treatment may improve outcomes. This commonly include compression therapy, good skin care, exercise, and manual lymphatic drainage (MLD), which together is known as combined decongestive therapy. MLD is most effective in mild to moderate disease. In breast cancer-related lymphedema, MLD is safe and may offer added benefit to compression bandages for reducing swelling. Most people with lymphedema can be medically managed with conservative treatment. Diuretics are not useful. Surgery is generally only used in those who are not improved with other measures.

Compression

Garments

Once a person is diagnosed with lymphedema, compression becomes imperative in the management of the condition. Garments are often intended to be worn all day but may be taken off for sleeping unless otherwise prescribed. Elastic compression garments are worn on the affected limb following complete de-congestive therapy to maintain edema reduction. Inelastic garments provide containment and reduction. Available styles, options, and prices vary widely. A professional garment fitter or certified lymphedema therapist can help determine the best option for the patient.

Bandaging
Compression bandaging, also called wrapping, is the application of layers of padding and short-stretch bandages to the involved areas. Short-stretch bandages are preferred over long-stretch bandages (such as those normally used to treat sprains), as the long-stretch bandages cannot produce the proper therapeutic tension necessary to safely reduce lymphedema and may in fact end up producing a tourniquet effect. Compression bandages provide resistance that assists in pumping fluid out of the affected area during exercise. This counter-force results in increased lymphatic drainage and therefore a decrease in size of the swollen area.

Intermittent pneumatic compression therapy
Intermittent pneumatic compression therapy (IPC) utilizes a multi-chambered pneumatic sleeve with overlapping cells to promote movement of lymph fluid. Pump therapy should be used in addition to other treatments such as compression bandaging and manual lymph drainage. Pump therapy has been used a lot in the past to help with controlling lymphedema. In some cases, pump therapy helps soften fibrotic tissue and therefore potentially enable more efficient lymphatic drainage. However, reports link pump therapy to increased incidence of edema proximal to the affected limb, such as genital edema arising after pump therapy in the lower limb. Current literature has suggested the use of IPC treatment in conjunction with Kinesiotape (KT) is more effective in the overall reduction of lymphedema as well as increasing shoulder ROM than the traditional treatment of IPC paired with complete decongestive therapy. Kinesiotape (KT) is an elastic cotton strip with an acrylic adhesive that is used commonly used to relieve the discomfort and disability associated with sports injuries, but in the context of lymphedema, this increases the space between the dermis and the muscle which increases the opportunity for lymphatic fluid to flow out naturally. The use of IPC treatments with KT tape as well as subsequent lymphatic drainage has proven to significantly reduce the circumference of lymphatic limbs in patients experiencing lymphedema secondary to breast cancer postmastectomy.

Exercise
In those with lymphedema or at risk of developing lymphedema, following breast cancer treatment, resistance training did not increase swelling and decreases in some, in addition to other potential beneficial effects on cardiovascular health. Moreover, resistance training and other forms of exercise were not associated with an increased risk of developing lymphedema in people who previously received breast cancer-related treatment. Compression garments should be worn during exercise (with the possible exception of swimming).

Physical therapy treatment of patients with lymphedema may include trigger point release, soft tissue massage, postural improvement, patient education on condition management, strengthening, and stretching exercises. Exercises may increase in intensity and difficulty over time, beginning with passive movements to increase range of motion and progressing towards using external weights and resistance in various postures.

Surgery 
The treatment of lymphedema is usually conservative, however the use of surgery is proposed for some cases.

Suction assisted lipectomy (SAL), also known as liposuction for lymphedema, may help improve chronic non pitting edema if present. The procedure removes fat and protein and is done along with continued compression therapy.

Vascularized lymph node transfers (VLNT) and lymphovenous bypass are supported by tentative evidence  but is associated with a number of complications.

Laser therapy
Low-level laser therapy (LLLT) was cleared by the US Food and Drug Administration (FDA) for the treatment of lymphedema in November 2006.

According to the US National Cancer Institute, LLLT may be effective in reducing lymphedema in some women. Two cycles of laser treatment were found to be reduce the volume of the affected arm in approximately one-third of people with postmastectomy lymphedema at three months post-treatment.

Epidemiology
Lymphedema affects approximately 200 million people worldwide.

References

External links 

Diseases of veins, lymphatic vessels and lymph nodes
Lymphatic vessel diseases